Pekka Alonen (born 13 February 1929) is a Finnish former alpine skier who competed in the 1952 Winter Olympics.

References

External links
 

1929 births
Possibly living people
Finnish male alpine skiers
Olympic alpine skiers of Finland
Alpine skiers at the 1952 Winter Olympics